The Ohio Junior Blue Jackets were a Tier 1 junior ice hockey team playing in the East Division of the United States Hockey League (USHL).  The 2006-07 USHL media guide (p. 37) lists the Ohio Junior Blue Jackets as the successor to the Thunder Bay Flyers, who played their last USHL game in 2000; however, the team infrastructure was based upon a move of the Cleveland Junior Barons of the NAHL. The Junior Blue Jackets' home ice was at Nationwide Arena, which is also home to the National Hockey League team Columbus Blue Jackets.

Ceased Operations
It was announced on May 11, 2008 that the Jr. Blue Jackets ceased operations for the 2008-2009 season after the owners and league worked to find a suitable location where this franchise could be a success. After finding no location on short notice for the upcoming season, the team ceased operations.

The USHL Board of Governors approved the transfer of 10-12 veteran players on Ohio's protected list to the Fargo Force, an expansion team for the 2008-2009 season. With the agreement the expansion draft was cancelled and Fargo had to give up their first three rounds picks of the USHL Entry Draft.
Note: "All players on the Ohio affiliate list will become free agents" (USHL).

References 

Sports teams in Columbus, Ohio
United States Hockey League teams
2006 establishments in Ohio
Ice hockey clubs established in 2006
2008 disestablishments in Ohio
Ice hockey clubs disestablished in 2008
Columbus Blue Jackets
Ice hockey teams in Ohio